The Japan national rugby league team, nicknamed the Samurais, represents Japan in rugby league football. Japan have played some international competition since 1994. The Japanese National Cup, the JRL domestic club competition, was founded in 1998. In 2021 the season was restarted after a break for COVID with five teams in two divisions, three clubs in East Japan, the Abiko Ducks, Mitaka Spartans and South Ikebukuro Rabbitohs; and two clubs in West Japan, the Kamisenryu Sea Turtles and The Kansai Kaminari.

History

Rugby league was founded in Japan in 1993 by former Australian first grade player, Max Mannix, who had played for the Canterbury-Bankstown Bulldogs and the Illawarra Steelers in Australia. While living in Japan, Mannix contacted the Australian Rugby League and requested entry into the 1994 Rugby League World Sevens, which was then played in Sydney as a precursor to the Australian professional rugby league competition, then known as the Winfield Cup. Mannix was given an interim period to prove that a competitive Japanese team could be formed, and over a period of 5 months, he made direct contact with rugby union players and invited them to play rugby league. With the support of his brother, Greg, and Masayuki Watabe, player numbers slowly climbed and regular weekly training sessions took place on the banks of the Tama River, located on the outskirts of Tokyo. In September 1993, Japan received an official invitation to participate in the 1994 World Sevens, an event that would provide the country with its first taste of rugby league competition; made up entirely of Japanese nationals derived from the Japanese rugby union teams, the Japan Rugby Football Union threatened the players with bans, but despite the threats, a Japanese team participated in the 1994 Rugby League World Sevens, playing games against Tonga, Great Britain, and Russia. Although the Japanese lost all 3 games, they proved to be a crowd favorite, and were invited to return to the event in 1995. The first 13-a-side rugby league team to represent Japan was the national university team that took part in the 1996 University World Cup.  The team was coached by Max Mannix with former Canterbury Bulldogs and Halifax player, Ken Isaacs, overseeing team management. Staged in Warrington, England, the event saw Japan compete against national university teams from Scotland, England, France, and the United States.

The following year, 1997, saw Japan compete in the University World Cup in France, with Ken Isaacs coaching the team, and Shoji Watanabe overseeing team management. The first Japanese player to be contracted to a professional rugby league club was Kenji Imanaga. Imanaga was given a scholarship by the Canterbury Bankstown Bulldogs, and was joined soon after by Ryoichi Ojima, a talented fleet-footed centre. With the support of (then) club supremo, Peter Bullfrog Moore, Imanaga and Ojima played regular games for Moorebank, Canterbury's feeder club, then coached by Kevin Moore.

The first international game that Japan won was at the 1995 Rugby League World Sevens in Brisbane, when they defeated Canada, but Japan was disqualified for fielding what was deemed to be an unregistered player, a claim that was contested by the Japanese officials who offered proof that their application to register the player was declined solely on the grounds of race. The protest was declined and the disqualification held. The first international 13-a-side rugby league test match won by Japan was in 1999 at the 2000 World Cup qualifying tournament which was held at Disney's Wide World of Sports Complex in Florida, USA, where Japan defeated Canada 14–0. Despite the victory, Japan failed to qualify for the World Cup, having been previously defeated by the United States.

In 2000, Japan went on to play in the Emerging Nations tournament, an event designed to provide emerging nations with evenly matched competition, the tournament ran in parallel with the Rugby League World Cup. The Japanese team at the Emerging Nations World Cup was coached by Tony Smith, who went on to become a successful coach in England, culminating with his appointment to coach the English national team in 2008 through 2009. The first rugby league team to visit, and play, against Japan, was a New South Wales Group 20 representative team in 1997, followed by the Lebanese national rugby league team in 1998.

Distance from any other rugby league competitions, and problems with player availability due to short Japanese holidays, have made regular competition for the Samurais difficult. However, Japan is currently in discussion with the newly formed Thailand and Philippines Rugby Leagues to enter the Asian Cup for 2014, after having to pull out in 2013.

Jersey

Current squad
Squad selected for the 2018 Emerging Nations World Championship.

Kazuki Fukushige
Lachlan Grieve
Amane Konishi
Yuki Mochizuki
Itaru Matsuo
Enemarki Shibasaki
Gehamat Shibasaki
Kenshi Tsutsui
Sean Gabites
Taou Sugano
Gorka Gerediaga Etxaburu
Hiroshi Fukasawa
Kenta Karino
Kohei Ishikawa
Keisuke Nakai
Akihito Kashiwaba
Jaye Brown
Futoshi Karino
Reiji Sano
Douglas Streeter

Matches

Ranking

There has been some controversy over Japan's ranking. Not being full members of the RLIF, and having difficulty in finding regular international competitions, they have been unranked since November 2012. Japan's highest rank was achieved in 2009 when the RLIF ranked them 17th in the world 
 before later falling to 28th and then being listed with the unranked nations.

Competitions
Japan has participated in a number of competitions:

World Sevens (1994, 1995, 1996, 1997, plus the qualification tournament in 2003, 2004)
Super League World Nines (1996, 1997)
Emerging Nations Tournament (2000)
NSWRL International Nines (2004–2013)

In 2002 and 2003, Japan contested the East-West Challenge in the United States of America. In 2003, a North Pacific Club Challenge was held between the Champion Clubs of each country, with the Kagoshima Broncos defeating the New York Knights. Both competitions have since been disbanded.

All-time Results Record

*Updated as of 14 November 2019

Results

International
 Japan def. Philippines 74–4 (9 November 2019)
 Japan def. Hong Kong 32–30 (11 October 2018)
Solomon Islands def. Japan 44–22 (9 October 2018)
Poland def. Japan 58–6 (7 October 2018)
Turkey def. Japan 60–0 (4 October 2018)
Hong Kong def. Japan 32–20 (16 June 2018) 
Japan def. Hong Kong 24–22 (4 November 2017)
Greece def. Japan 72–0 (8 October 2016)
Thailand def. Japan 30–6 (15 October 2015)
Japan def. Thailand 52–16 (29 April 2015)
Thailand def. Japan 46–10 (30 January 2014)
 Portugal def. Japan 26–20 (31 January 2013) 
 Portugal RL def. Japan 28–16 (6 February 2008) as 10s match
 Malta def. Japan 82–0 (25 January 2007) 
 USA def. Japan 58–18 (28 October 2006)
 USA def. Japan 40–10 (26 January 2006)
 USA def. Japan 78–6 (27 June 2003)
 USA def. Japan 26–12 (1 June 2002)
 Canada def. Japan 28–12 (20 November 2000)
 Morocco def. Japan 12–8 (15 November 2000)
 BARLA (Great Britain Amateurs) 54 Japan 0 (2000)
 USA def. Japan 54–0 (1999)
 Japan def. Canada 14–0 (1999)
 Lebanon def. Japan 52–28 (1998)

World Sevens results
 NASCA Aboriginals def. Japan 36–0 (24 January 2003)
 USA Tomahawks def. Japan 28–4 (24 January 2003)
 USA Tomahawks def. Japan 20–8 (1996)

International Nines results
 2008 Bowl Finalists Newtown 36 def. Japan 4
Semi-final, Japan 22 Def. Portugal 6

Student results
 USA def. Japan 54–10 (1996)

See also

References

External links
 Japan Rugby League Homepage (Japanese)

National rugby league teams
Rugby League
League
Rugby League pages needing cleanup